MOL Triumph is a container ship completed in March 2017 by Samsung Heavy Industries in Geoje, South Korea. The vessel was built for the Japanese shipping operator Mitsui O.S.K. Lines. 
The ship was christened in a ceremony in South Korea on March 15, 2017.
The Triumph has 5 sister ships in its class, the Trust, Tribute, Tradition, Truth, and Treasure.

Design
The ship has various highly advanced energy-saving technologies including low friction underwater paint, high efficiency rudder and propeller, which reduce the water resistance.

Engineering
Triumph'''s main engine is the MAN B&W G95ME, with a maximum output power of 82,440 kW. 
This is enough for the vessel to operate with service speed of 22.0 knots, while the maximum speed is 24.0 knots.

Service of operationsTriumph'' is deployed at the Alliance’s Asia to Europe trade via the FE2 service. The container ship set off on her maiden voyage from Xingang in April 2017 and sailed to Dalian, Qingdao, Shanghai, Ningbo, Hong Kong, Yantian and Singapore. She then transited through the Suez Canal and continued on to Tangier, Southampton, Hamburg, Rotterdam and Le Havre. She calls at Tangier and Jebel Ali on the way back to Asia.

In September 2022, during the first 5-year inspection and dry dock turn, the vessel was renamed to "ONE TRIUMPH" and also received a fresh coat of Magenta paint, in line with the colors of the Ocean Network Express, the merger of the three Japanese containervdivisions of Mitsui O.S.K. Lines, NYK Line and K-Line.

References

External links
MOL Triumph

2017 ships
Container ships
Ships of the Marshall Islands